St. Aloysius High School is a high school in Nalasopara, Maharashtra, India. It is one of the oldest schools in the Mumbai suburbs. It was started from a small campus in the Majithia area of Nallasopara East in 1992. In 1995, it shifted to its new campus.

St Aloysius High School offers education from Kindergarten to HSC or 12th grade in streams of arts and science. It is affiliated to Maharashtra Board of Secondary and Higher Secondary Education. It is one of the oldest schools founded under the Xavier Group Of Schools. It is one of the main centre of SSC Board Exams in Nallasopara. The school has a very big playground and many students take part in sports like athletics, cricket, and football.

St Aloysius High School has sports coaching and education provided by highly qualified teachers. St Aloysius High School teaches 4,500 students per year. The average  class size is 70. Nine lectures are conducted for morning and afternoon batches including half an hour break for class 1 to 10.

References

External links
 https://www.ryaninternational.org/

High schools and secondary schools in Maharashtra
Education in Palghar district
Educational institutions established in 1992
1992 establishments in Maharashtra